Jovan Jordan Bridges (born August 22, 1993), known by the stage name Yvie Oddly, is an American drag queen, performer, fashion designer, rapper, and recording artist from Denver, Colorado who came to international attention in 2019 when she won the eleventh season of RuPaul's Drag Race. She later returned to compete on the seventh season of RuPaul's Drag Race All Stars, an all-winners season, in 2022. Oddly has been on the worldwide Werq the World drag concert tour since 2019. In addition to music videos and performances, she explores what she sees as a transformative power of drag by making thrift store finds into wearable art in Yvie Oddly's Oddities series on WOW Presents Plus. She released her debut album, Drag Trap, in 2020.

Early life and education 
Jovan Bridges was born on August 22, 1993, in Denver, Colorado. As a child, she played with her mother's makeup and dressed in her sister's clothes, "When I was a six-year-old boy playing dress-up in my sister's tutus and makeup, my parents were like, 'Take that off.' And I was like, 'Why?' I felt pretty and I'd sleep in a skirt every night." She participated in gymnastics and other strenuous extracurricular activities until she was diagnosed with Ehlers-Danlos syndrome at age fifteen. She began musical theatre as an alternative.

Bridges describes her first exposure to drag as taking place in middle school, when a classmate dressed up as a hooker for Halloween and attracted significant attention. The following Halloween, Bridges dressed as a hooker and enjoyed both her peers' shock and admiration. Bridges attended East High School, and went to college at the Auraria Campus, both in Denver.

Career

Early career 
Oddly started her career as Avon Eve, performing for her first time at the Center in Denver, CO. before moving on to performing at Broadways Bar in a show hosted by Mile High Pinky Pie.

Oddly committed to drag after seeing Sharon Needles on the fourth season of RuPaul's Drag Race which aired in 2012, stating that "[Sharon Needles] was spooky. Her makeup was terrible. She was more dedicated to art and wit than being a glamorous female impersonator." Prior to this, Oddly did not embrace all the opportunities that being a drag artist offered, as she considered herself just a "skinny, black, gay guy."

Oddly started doing drag during college in 2012 when Venus D'lite from RuPaul's Drag Race hosted a workshop on the college campus for Valentine's Day, stating that she "attempted some drag (or ghost) makeup, put on a super-cheap red wig and dress, and backflipped my way through "Scheiße" by Lady Gaga". Her first performances were at Denver's gay bar Tracks. The name 'Yvie Oddly' came from her pun to express "being even odder than anybody else"; Oddly soon developed a reputation for having "outrageous and unconventional looks on stage". Her ingenuity came from financial necessity as making the "most glamorous or the most expensive" looks was not an option, saying that "I’ve just always liked to work with the materials that I have around me." In 2014, Oddly was an extra in the music video for Sharon Needles's "Dressed to Kill."

Oddly was the winner of the Ultimate Queen of Denver pageant in 2015. Later that summer, Oddly became a cast member of Drag Nation; opened for pop star Mya on the Main Stage for PrideFest; and performed in Bohemia's The Prohibition of Lust. She was also in the music video for Adore Delano's "Negative Nancy" in 2017.

In 2017, Oddly stated that she used drag to confront gender roles. In 2018, when asked about her drag aesthetics, Oddly said that she liked to shock and surprise with something the audience had not seen before, including dramatic looks, even employing unconventional and found materials. In 2019, she described herself as a drag queen who blends "artistry, fashion, performance and concept". She draws inspiration from French fashion designer Thierry Mugler, British designer and haute couturier Alexander McQueen, and 'terrorist' drag queen Christeene.

In 2018, Oddly was both the manager at her Denver home drag bar as well as a drag queen, and was looking to transform her drag into a full-time job. She felt the time to make a drastic life change was imminent even if her audition tape did not get her onto RuPaul's Drag Race.

RuPaul's Drag Race 
Oddly was announced to be on season eleven of RuPaul's Drag Race in January 2019; it was her third time to apply as a contestant. She is the second queen from Denver to compete on Drag Race, after Nina Flowers. During the competition Oddly was noted for her eccentric and conceptual looks, her performance ability and her quirky and outspoken personality, she quickly became a fan and judges favorite. Oddly said the time of the competition was somewhat lonely as she was unable to talk to friends or family. She spoke about her motives for competing on the show:

Oddly was the winner of the second episode main challenge with Scarlet Envy. She spent six weeks in a row placing in the top of the competition which makes her the queen with the most times in a row placing in the top after Jinkx Monsoon with eight times. In the eighth episode, however, she and Brooke Lynn Hytes both "bombed" on Snatch Game, the show's parody of celebrity-led Match Game. Hytes, who was also doing very well up to then, and Oddly were the bottom two queens and had to lip-sync battle to Demi Lovato's "Sorry Not Sorry" widely seen as one of the best battles in the show's history, causing RuPaul to keep both competitors.

During the show, she was in a constant rivalry with fellow competitor Silky Nutmeg Ganache. When asked by RuPaul who should go home Silky named Oddly because of her twisted ankle even though Oddly completed the choreography, Oddly named Silky as the one who should leave because she was resistant to critiques from RuPaul and the other judges. Entertainment site Gold Derby held a poll with 94% siding with Oddly. During the March 21 episode, while the queens were being taught some complex choreography for a live production of the political satire Trump: The Rusical, Oddly revealed she had to be careful about dropping to the ground as her joints often popped out of place. She has a connective tissue disorder called Ehlers–Danlos syndrome type 3 which means she doesn't produce as much collagen. Hers is a subtype that is known as hypermobile Ehlers-Danlos syndrome (hEDS). Despite her explanation, Ehlers-Danlos syndromes are associated with faulty collagen production and collagen-modifying enzymes.

In the penultimate episode, the final five queens wrote, recorded, danced, and performed a verse in a single-shot video hip-hop version of RuPaul's "Queens Everywhere". Out said Oddly's performance was the best with her work on point and well performed. They added, "Her risks, boldness, and weirdo ideas have often landed her harsh critiques and enemies on the show — but at least she's out here taking risks". Judge Todrick Hall later apologized for calling her choreography spastic, he was told by fans in the United Kingdom that it was a taboo thing to say in that country. The judges praised her performance, her verse and her final runway look, and she received the best critiques of the night making her the first queen to be named by RuPaul to move to the finale. Of the top four she was the only one without multiple challenge wins, but also had the fewest times landing in the bottom two, along with rival Silky Nutmeg Ganache.

In the season finale, held in Los Angeles' Orpheum Theatre, Oddly was in the final three and lip-sync battled against A'keria Davenport to Rihanna's "SOS", which she won. For that she wore a dress decorated with stuffed animals toys and neon fake fur. Oddly then faced off in the final lip-sync against Brooke Lynn Hytes to Lady Gaga's "The Edge of Glory", which she also won. She had already shown she could deliver impressive physical performances, so refrained from stunts or gags, and worked to "connect to the song, and deliver a strong artistic performance that would hopefully still get my voice out as an artist."

For the final battle Oddly wore a distinctive headpiece with mirrors that from the front made her look like she had three faces, and on the back was a second mask, the headpiece was made by Darrell Thorne, while Kristi Siedow-Thompson designed the dress. Her parents, who had not spoken to one another in years, sat together in the audience in support. Oddly was declared the winner of Season 11 of Drag Race, and "America's Next Drag Superstar", on May 30, 2019. She encouraged the audience to "Follow your oddities and fly your freak flag!" Oddly also set a record with having the fewest challenge wins of any winner in RuPaul's Drag Race history, a record later tied by her drag sister and season 14 winner Willow Pill.

Oddly's win is the latest in a series of title wins by black queer and trans people in drag pageants and leather competitions, a turnaround for LGBTQ communities. She feels that queer people of color have not been credited enough for their contributions to queer culture. Oddly is "part Black, part Caucasian, and some part Native American." Additionally she says, "there's been so much debate on my race: whether or not I'm Black, whether or not colorism is at play." Her anger at being disrespected by the gay community because of being Black prompted her to get into drag.

In Episode 1 of All Stars 5, Yvie made a guest appearance as a "Lip Sync Assassin", where she lip-synced against India Ferrah and won.

Werq the World tour to present 
Oddly was criticized, especially on social media, for not elevating her looks to befit her title of Drag Queen Superstar, while also being awarded the $100,000 prize. She pointed out that she was a poor Black drag queen with no connections in the larger drag world with humble roots who put everything into her art when she won. By her first DragCon the only thing that had changed were the connections. She said, "so I spent the next nine months paying back the debt of being THE FIRST winner of my kind since the show's mainstream crossover." She was repeatedly called 'garbage' so decided to reclaim the concept with her looks. "If you refuse to see the ideals behind my choices then it's because you operate from a place of privilege where fashion and drag don't have to speak to your life circumstances, especially not socioeconomically".

Oddly was a part of the 2019 North American leg of the Werq the World tour, a multi-year international drag concert tour hosted by Michelle Visage and featuring RuPaul's Drag Race queens. The tour visited seventeen cities throughout North America, including five in Canada. It began in Los Angeles during RuPaul's DragCon LA and ended in September in New York City during RuPaul's DragCon NYC. The tour continued to major cities in Asia, Australia and New Zealand, ending in November.

In June 2019, Oddly performed at Denver's PrideFest, the city's annual LGBTQ pride parade and festival, and hosted "Drag Nation" at her home bar Tracks. Her first post-win U.K. performance was at Bournemouth's DYMK. As part of Stonewall 50 – WorldPride NYC 2019, the world's largest LGBTQ event, Oddly will perform at the June 26th Opening Ceremony benefiting the Ali Forney Center, Immigration Equality, and Services & Advocacy for GLBT Elders (SAGE), and at the LadyLand Festival June 28.

In June 2019 World of Wonder, the production company behind RuPaul's Drag Race, announced Oddly will star in her own reality show series, Yvie Oddly's Oddities aired worldwide on WOW Presents Plus. It follows the bargain-hunting queen to thrift stores where she shops for "throwaway items to turn one queen's trash into her jaw-dropping fashion treasures". Oddly explained that, "Drag is all about the power of transformation."

In July 2019, she was criticized for no longer doing selfies after shows citing being physically exhausted; she later added that she had to set boundaries. Her genetic condition Hypermobile Ehlers–Danlos syndrome (hEDS) results in chronic pain so she foregoes post-show selfies for more meaningful interactions. Appearing on Drag Race, let alone winning, put Oddly on a steep learning curve to transform every aspect of her drag art into a business. It also forced her to re-evaluate what she could physically do—as contorting her body in performances takes a toll—while still delivering a drag experience for her audiences. Oddly stated,

In September 2019, at RuPaul's DragCon NYC, Oddly was named as one of a rotating cast of a dozen Drag Race queens in RuPaul's Drag Race Live!, a Las Vegas show residency at the Flamingo Las Vegas.

When asked about the impact of the COVID-19 pandemic, with its required social distancing and stay-at-home orders (starting in March 2020), Oddly remarked that it brought her back to her roots of being creative at home with her roommates. She also feels it frees her to tell more complete stories via video when she can layer performances atop one another, "[until now] I haven't really had a whole lot of time to invest back into the artistry of my drag and to do one-off performances and really throw my all into the creative concept."

In April 2022, Oddly was announced as one of the eight returning winners that would be competing in seventh season of RuPaul's Drag Race All Stars, the first ever all-winners season of Drag Race.

Personal life 
Oddly has been diagnosed with type 3 Hypermobile Ehlers–Danlos syndrome (hEDS). With her heightened status, she has found a content community of people living with 'hEDS', and other invisible disabilities, who call themselves "zebras", as they have more exotic diseases than doctors would expect. The condition as well as the chronic pain of her "bones grinding" leave her depleted after performing so she foregoes post-show photo ops for more meaningful interactions.

Oddly is the grandchild of Denver Black Panther's leader Lauren Watson.

As a drag queen, she is the drag sister of Willow Pill, who won the fourteenth season of RuPaul's Drag Race.

Filmography

Television

Web series

Discography

Studio albums

Singles

As lead artist

As featured artist

Music videos

As lead artists

Guest appearances

Notes

References

External links 
 

1993 births
Living people
American drag queens
African-American drag queens
Gay entertainers
People from Denver
People with Ehlers–Danlos syndrome
RuPaul's Drag Race winners
LGBT African Americans
LGBT Native Americans
LGBT people from Colorado
American LGBT musicians
LGBT rappers
RuPaul's Drag Race All Stars contestants